Osowiec may refer to:
Osowiec, Łódź Voivodeship (central Poland)
Osowiec, Lubusz Voivodeship (west Poland)
Osowiec, Masovian Voivodeship (east-central Poland)
Osowiec, Łomża County in Podlaskie Voivodeship (north-east Poland)
Osowiec, Mońki County in Podlaskie Voivodeship (north-east Poland)
Osowiec, Zambrów County in Podlaskie Voivodeship (north-east Poland)
Osowiec, Pomeranian Voivodeship (north Poland)
Osowiec, Warmian-Masurian Voivodeship (north Poland)
Osowiec, Słupca County in Greater Poland Voivodeship (west-central Poland)
Osowiec, Złotów County in Greater Poland Voivodeship (west-central Poland)
Osówiec, Greater Poland Voivodeship, Greater Poland Voivodeship (west-central Poland)
Osowiec Fortress, Russian fortress built in the 19th century in modern-day Osowiec-Twierdza, defended during World War I, today in Poland

See also
Osovets Offensive
Osowiec-Leśniczówka, a village in Łomża County, Podlaskie Voivodeship
Osowiec-Twierdza, a village in Gmina Goniądz, Mońki County, Podlaskie Voivodeship